Protogeneia (Ancient Greek:  means "the firstborn"), in Greek mythology, may refer to:

Protogeneia, a Phthian princess as the daughter of King Deucalion of Thessaly and Pyrrha, mythological progenitors of the Hellenes. She was the sister of Hellen and Amphictyon, and possibly of Thyia and Pandora II, Melantho (Melanthea) and Candybus. By Zeus, Protogeneia became the mother of Opus, Aethlius, Aetolus and possibly of Dorus.
Protogeneia, also called Cambyse, daughter of the above Opus. Zeus carried her off from the land of the Epeans and became by her, on mount Maenalus in Arcadia, the father of Opus II. She was later received by Locrus who for being childless, married Protogeneia and adopted her son Opus as his own.
Protogeneia, a Calydonian princess as the daughter of King Calydon and Aeolia, daughter of Amythaon, and thus sister to Epicaste. By Ares, Protogeneia became the mother of Oxylus of Aetolia.
Protogeneia, an Athenian princess as the eldest of the daughters of King Erechtheus and probably Praxithea, daughter of Phrasimus and Diogeneia. She and her sister Pandora committed suicide when Erechtheus sacrificed Chthonia, another sister of theirs. Protogeneia's other sisters were Procris, Creusa, Oreithyia, Merope while her possible brothers were Cecrops, Pandorus, Metion, Orneus, Thespius, Eupalamus and Sicyon.

Notes

References 

 Apollodorus, The Library with an English Translation by Sir James George Frazer, F.B.A., F.R.S. in 2 Volumes, Cambridge, MA, Harvard University Press; London, William Heinemann Ltd. 1921. . Online version at the Perseus Digital Library. Greek text available from the same website.
 Diodorus Siculus, The Library of History translated by Charles Henry Oldfather. Twelve volumes. Loeb Classical Library. Cambridge, Massachusetts: Harvard University Press; London: William Heinemann, Ltd. 1989. Vol. 3. Books 4.59–8. Online version at Bill Thayer's Web Site.
 Diodorus Siculus, Bibliotheca Historica. Vol 1-2. Immanel Bekker. Ludwig Dindorf. Friedrich Vogel. in aedibus B. G. Teubneri. Leipzig. 1888–1890. Greek text available at the Perseus Digital Library.
 Drachmann, Anders Bjørn, Scholia Vetera in Pindari Carmina, Vol. I: Scholia in Olympionicas, Leipzig, Teubner, 1903. . Internet Archive. Online version at De Gruyter (1997 reprint). Online version at the Perseus Digital Library.
 Hyginus, Gaius Julius, Fabulae from the Myths of Hyginus translated and edited by Mary Grant. University of Kansas Publications in Humanistic Studies. Online version at the Topos Text Project.
 Gantz, Timothy, Early Greek Myth: A Guide to Literary and Artistic Sources, Johns Hopkins University Press, 1996, Two volumes:  (Vol. 1),  (Vol. 2).
 Grimal, Pierre, The Dictionary of Classical Mythology, Wiley-Blackwell, 1996. .
 Hard, Robin, The Routledge Handbook of Greek Mythology: Based on H.J. Rose's "Handbook of Greek Mythology", Psychology Press, 2004, . Google Books.
 Lucius Mestrius Plutarchus, Lives with an English Translation by Bernadotte Perrin. Cambridge, MA. Harvard University Press. London. William Heinemann Ltd. 1914. 1. Online version at the Perseus Digital Library.
 Pausanias, Description of Greece with an English Translation by W.H.S. Jones, Litt.D., and H.A. Ormerod, M.A., in 4 Volumes. Cambridge, MA, Harvard University Press; London, William Heinemann Ltd. 1918. . Online version at the Perseus Digital Library.
 Pindar, Odes translated by Diane Arnson Svarlien. 1990. Online version at the Perseus Digital Library.
 Pseudo-Clement, Recognitions from Ante-Nicene Library Volume 8, translated by Smith, Rev. Thomas. T. & T. Clark, Edinburgh. 1867. Online version at Theoi.com
 Stephanus of Byzantium, Stephani Byzantii Ethnicorum quae supersunt, edited by August Meineike (1790-1870), published 1849. A few entries from this important ancient handbook of place names have been translated by Brady Kiesling. Online version at the Topos Text Project.
 Suida, Suda Encyclopedia translated by Ross Scaife, David Whitehead, William Hutton, Catharine Roth, Jennifer Benedict, Gregory Hays, Malcolm Heath Sean M. Redmond, Nicholas Fincher, Patrick Rourke, Elizabeth Vandiver, Raphael Finkel, Frederick Williams, Carl Widstrand, Robert Dyer, Joseph L. Rife, Oliver Phillips and many others. Online version at the Topos Text Project.

Deucalionids
Princesses in Greek mythology
Women of Ares
Mortal women of Zeus
Aetolian characters in Greek mythology
Attican characters in Greek mythology
Suicides in Greek mythology
Arcadian mythology
Locris
es:Protogenia
fr:Protogénie
fi:Protogeneia
Thessalian characters in Greek mythology